The Arabian wheatear (Oenanthe lugentoides) is a species of bird in the family Muscicapidae. It is found in Oman, Saudi Arabia and Yemen.

References

Arabian wheatear
Birds of the Arabian Peninsula
Arabian wheatear
Arabian wheatear
Taxonomy articles created by Polbot
Taxobox binomials not recognized by IUCN